Kalininsky District is the name of several administrative and municipal districts in Russia.  The districts are generally named for Mikhail Kalinin, a Soviet statesman.

Districts of the federal subjects

Kalininsky District, Krasnodar Krai, an administrative and municipal district of Krasnodar Krai
Kalininsky District, Saratov Oblast, an administrative and municipal district of Saratov Oblast
Kalininsky District, Tver Oblast, an administrative and municipal district of Tver Oblast
Kalininsky District, Saint Petersburg, an administrative district of the federal city of St. Petersburg

Former districts
Kalininsky District, Moscow, a former district of Moscow

City divisions
Kalininsky City District, Cheboksary, a city district of Cheboksary, the capital of the Chuvash Republic
Kalininsky City District, Chelyabinsk, an administrative and municipal city district of Chelyabinsk, the administrative center of Chelyabinsk Oblast
Kalininsky City District, Novosibirsk, a city district of Novosibirsk, the administrative center of Novosibirsk Oblast
Kalininsky Administrative Okrug, an administrative okrug of the city of Tyumen, the administrative center of Tyumen Oblast
Kalininsky City District, Ufa, a city district of Ufa, the capital of the Republic of Bashkortostan

See also
Kalininsky (disambiguation)
Kalinin (disambiguation)
Kalininsk (disambiguation)

References